Painters and Dockers are a rock band formed in Melbourne, Australia in 1982.

Paul Stewart, singer-songwriter and trumpet player, Dave Pace (vocals and trumpet) and Mick Morris (vocals and sax) are all original members in the band which was named for the Federated Ship Painters and Dockers Union when they performed an early gig at a pub rock venue in Port Melbourne frequented by the union's members. Some members of the band went on to form the Dili Allstars.

Their best-performing album Kiss My Art, peaked in the top 30 of the Australian Recording Industry Association (ARIA) albums charts in 1988. The album included two top 50 singles, "Nude School" and "Die Yuppie Die".

In 2009, the band was inducted into the Music Victoria Hall of Fame.

History

1982−1987: Beginnings, Love Planet and Bucket
Painters and Dockers formed in Melbourne, Australia in 1982 with five members, Vladimir Juric on guitars and backing vocals, Andy Marron on drums, Phil Nelson on bass guitar, Chris O'Connor on guitars and backing vocals, and mainstay Paul Stewart on lead vocals and trumpet. One of the earliest gigs for the unnamed group was at a pub rock venue in Port Melbourne frequented by members of the Federated Ship Painters and Dockers Union so they chose Painters and Dockers for the event and retained the name thereafter. In their earlier years, they were the headline act at the Port Melbourne Community Festival, and in a government initiative called Rockin' the Rails, where they played songs from the back of a train, as it stopped at various Melbourne stations, including Ringwood, Camberwell and Flinders Street. 

Painters and Dockers' first recording, "Mohawk Baby", was released on independent label, Au Go Go records' compilation album, Asleep at the Wheel early in 1984. Soon after, Marron was replaced by Colin Buckler on drums, and they released their debut album, Love Planet, which was produced by veteran hard rocker, Lobby Loyde and released on Big Time Records in 1984 and contained the tracks, "Basia!", also released as a single in March 1985, and "The Boy Who Lost His Jocks on Flinders Street Station". Joining after the album's release were Mick Morris on tenor saxophone and Dave Pace on trumpet / backing vocals, and with Stewart the horn section was called the Brassholes. Music historian, Ian McFarlane, describes their sound as "adding an earthy R&B edge to the band's raucous, punk-infused power pop".

A four-track EP, Kill Kill Kill was released in 1985 containing cover versions of "Kill Kill Kill" originally by The Sacred Cows on "The Groovy Guru" episode of US comedy TV series, Get Smart; Australian group Supernaut's "I Like it Both Ways"; The Ramones' "Do You Remember Rock'n'Roll Radio?" and The Saints' "Know Your Product". Their first single, "Basia!", released in March 1985 on Big Time Records, was a paean to Basia Bonkowski—lyrics include "B she's so beautiful, A articulate too, S sensual, I international, Ay Ay" and "She's sitting there with her multi-coloured hair / She's sitting there with that multi-cultured stare"—who was presenter of SBS' music television show, Rock Around the World from 1982 to late 1984. 

A live album, Bucket, released in October 1986 on the band's own label Dock Records (distributed by Shock Records) and Big Time Records, featured one of their live pub rock performances.

1988–1997: Kiss My Art, Touch One, Touch All and The Things that Matter
The band's second studio album, Kiss My Art, was released in August 1988 on White Label Records (a subsidiary of Mushroom Records) and peaked at No. 23 on the Australian Recording Industry Association (ARIA) albums charts in September 1988. The album spawned four singles, "Nude School", "Die Yuppie Die", "Love on Your Breath" and "Safe Sex", and the first two achieved top 50 chart success. and were accompanied with video clips directed by ex Hunters & Collectors Geoff Crosby. The album was again produced by Lobby Loyde, except for "Nude School" which was produced by Francois Taviaux aka Franswah.

Their third studio album, Touch One, Touch All, was released in December 1989 spawning the related singles, "Dirty Filthy Rock'n'Roll" in November, and "Eat Shit Die" in May 1990. Neither album nor singles peaked into the top 50. Morris left in 1989 and Darren Garth had replaced Juric on guitar by early 1990; the band undertook a Canadian tour promoting the album. 

In December 1991 they released the mini-album, Hickory Dickory Dock with its track "Merry Christmas, Carol" and the single, "New World Order". Nervous '90s appeared in June 1992 and contained six studio tracks and three live tracks recorded with the Salvation Army Brass Band. During 1992 they became involved in Performers Releasing Information about Clean Syringes (PRICS), which included running workshops and gigs on safe sex and drug use. In 1993, Garth left and Colin Badger joined on guitar and backing vocals, Painters and Dockers undertook the Australia-wide Return to the Love Planet tour and released a pro gay single, "I Know Better Queens than That". 
The EP, Hickory Dickory Dock, and the album The Things that Matter were released in 1994.

1998–present: The Things that Matter 
A mini-album,  Advance Australia Where?, was released in August 1998 with the single "You're Going Home in the Back of a Divi Van". By that stage, original members, Nelson and O'Connor had left, mainstay Stewart now with Badger and Buckler were joined by Paul Calvert on bass guitar, Sonja Parkinson on trombone and backing vocals, and Jenny Pineapple on saxophone and backing vocals. This line-up appeared at Mushroom 25 Live concert in November to celebrate the record label's anniversary, their track "Divi Van" appeared on the related VHS release, Mushroom 25 Live: The Concert of the Century.

In 2009 Stewart  featured on the ABC Compass religious program following a liver transplant with the episode featuring Painters And Dockers songs Nude School and Die Yuppie Die. Stewart is actively involved in fundraising for the Alma Nuns, a Timorese-based Catholic order who care for disabled children and orphans.

On 20 November 2009, early members, Paul Stewart, Chris O'Connor, Colin Buckler, Vladimir Juric, David Pace and Mick Morris, with Michael Badger (not an original member) reformed for a one-off show at the Prince Bandroom in St Kilda, Melbourne, where the band was inducted into Music Victoria's Hall of Fame.

In 2017, Painters and Dockers undertook their 30th Anniversary, Kiss My Art tour.

Members
Painters and Dockers members:

Discography

Studio albums

Live albums

Extended plays

Singles

Awards and nominations

ARIA Music Awards
The ARIA Music Awards is an annual awards ceremony that recognises excellence, innovation, and achievement across all genres of Australian music. They commenced in 1987.

|
|-
| 1988
| Painters and Dockers
| ARIA Award for Best New Talent
| 
| 
|-

The Age EG Awards
The Age EG Awards are an annual awards night celebrating Victorian music. They commenced in 2005.

|-
| 2009 || Painters and Dockers || Hall Of Fame || 
|-

References

External links
  Painters and Dockers discography @ Australian Rock Database by Magnus Holmgren
 Painters and Dockers discography @ Discogs
 Painters and Dockers discography @ MusicBrainz
 Painter and Dockers discography @ Australian Independent Record Labels Association (AIR)
 Painters and Dockers Facebook page

Australian rock music groups
Musical groups established in 1982
Victoria (Australia) musical groups
Pub rock musical groups
1982 establishments in Australia